HMS Merlin was a 10-gun snow-rigged sloop-of-war, the first of 21 Royal Navy vessels in the . Launched in 1744, she was the first Royal Navy sloop to carry the new 6-pounder cannons, in place of the 3-pounder guns on predecessor craft. As a fast and comparatively heavily armed vessel, she saw active service against French privateers during the War of the Austrian Succession, capturing five enemy vessels during her four years at sea. She was also present for the Battle of Saint-Louis-du-Sud in 1748 but was too small to play a truly active role in bombarding the fort.

The sloop was decommissioned at the end of the War, and declared surplus to Admiralty needs in July 1748. She was sold out of Navy service at Plymouth Dockyard on 16 November 1748.

References

Bibliography

External links
 

Sloops of the Royal Navy
1744 ships
Ships built in Limehouse